Hurling was featured in the Summer Olympic Games unofficial programme in 1904. The competition was won by Innisfail Hurling Club of host city St. Louis, Missouri who played a match on 20 July 1904.

See also
 1904 Summer Olympics
 Hurling

References

External links
 GB Athletics – Olympic Games Medallists – Other Sports – Demonstration & Unofficial Sports

Olympics
1904 Summer Olympics events
Discontinued sports at the Summer Olympics
Olympics
Olympics
Men's events at the 1904 Summer Olympics